Vilcún La Malla Airport is an airport  west-southwest of Vilcún in the La Araucanía Region of Chile.

See also

Transport in Chile
List of airports in Chile

References

External links
OpenStreetMap - Vilcún La Malla
OurAirports - Vilcún La Malla
FallingRain - Vilcún La Malla Airport

Airports in Chile
Airports in La Araucanía Region